Meriç is a district of Edirne Province, Turkey. The population is 2100 as of 2018. The mayor is Erol Dübek (CHP).

History
The land was conquered by the  Ottomans in 1361. Until the Balkan Wars in 1912, a part of the district was part of Soufli (back then still part of the Ottoman Empire), with the other part being connected to the neighbouring district Uzunköprü. After Soufli was lost to Greece in 1913, a new district was formed with the name Kavaklı. From 1920 to 1922, the area was annexed by Greece. Until 1930, the name stayed the same. In 1930, the district got its current name Meriç.

Geography
The district shares a 56 kilometer long border with Greece at the north and west. District of Uzunköprü is located at the east and south-east. To the south is Ipsala.

Name
Kavaklı (1913-1930) 
Meriç (1930-present)

The name Meriç comes from the river of  Meriç, a river dividing the border between present day Turkey and Greece.

References

External links
 Edirne Photos - Meriç Photos

Populated places in Edirne Province
Districts of Edirne Province